The 1922 Michigan Agricultural Aggies football team represented Michigan Agricultural College (MAC) as an independent during the 1922 college football season. In their second and final year under head coach Albert Barron, the Aggies compiled a 3–5–2 record and were outscored by their opponents 135 to 111.

Schedule

Game summaries

Michigan

On November 4, 1922, the Aggies lost to Michigan, 63–0. Lloyd Northard wrote in the Detroit Free Press that "not in the past 10 years has an Aggie team been so utterly out-classed in every department of the game." Fully embracing the passing game, Michigan threw 33 passes with 17 completions. Northard wrote that the game at times "more resembled basketball than football" and called it "the greatest exhibition of aerial play ever witnessed on Ferry Field," setting records for both passes thrown and completed.

References

Michigan Agricultural
Michigan State Spartans football seasons
Michigan Agricultural Aggies football